The Pribilof Canyon is a long submarine canyon rising from the Bering Abyssal Plain on the floor of the Bering Sea to the southeast of the Pribilof Islands in Alaska. It connects to the Bering Canyon at its west end.

Submarine canyons of the Bering Sea
Submarine canyons of the Pacific Ocean